Eocephalites is an extinct genus from a well-known class of fossil cephalopods, the ammonites. It lived during the Bajocian.

References

Jurassic ammonites
Ammonites of North America
Bajocian life